Je Jong-hyun (born 6 December 1991) is a South Korean footballer who plays as goalkeeper for Asan Mugunghwa.

Career
He was selected by Gwangju FC in the 2013 K League draft.

References

External links 

1991 births
Living people
Association football goalkeepers
South Korean footballers
Gwangju FC players
Gimcheon Sangmu FC players
Asan Mugunghwa FC players
K League 1 players
K League 2 players